Mammal is the second studio album by the Irish black metal band Altar of Plagues. It was released through Candlelight Records in Europe and Profound Lore Records in North America, each with different artwork.

Reception
The album received positive reviews from most critics. Brandon Stosuy of Pitchfork selected Mammal as 18th album of the top 40 metal albums of 2011.

Track listing

Personnel
Altar of Plagues
James Kelly – vocals, guitars, keyboards
Dave Condon – vocals, bass
Johnny King – drums

Technical personnel
Timo Ketola – artwork (Profound Lore version)
Daniel Sesé – artwork (Candlelight Records version)
Ross O'Donovan – engineering
Tadhg Healy – assistant engineer
Tore Stjerna – mastering
James Kelly – production

References

External links

Mammal at Encyclopaedia Metallum

2011 albums
Altar of Plagues albums
Profound Lore Records albums
Candlelight Records albums